Campo da Feiteira was a football dirt field in Lisbon, Portugal. It started as field for Grupo Sport de Benfica to organize Sports Festivals. On 26 May 1907, Grupo Sport de Benfica officially taken over of Quinta da Feiteira, next to Estrada de Benfica, having from now on, a 120 meters per 79 metres field, for $20 a semester. On 14 July 1907 it celebrated here, the first anniversary of Grupo Sport de Benfica.

Grupo Sport Lisboa (GSL) did not have a field in its originating area (Belém) but since some of its members were also members of GSB, they knew about Campo da Feiteira, and despite their quality, it was not used for football. So on 24 November 1907, Grupo Sport Lisboa played for the first time in Campo da Feiteira, even thought as neutral field, counting to the Lisbon Football Championship, Grupo Sport Lisboa beat Internacional (CIF).

In March 1908, Grupo Sport Benfica changes its name to Sport Clube de Benfica. On 13 September 1908, after absorbing its members and the playing field of Grupo Sport Benfica, Grupo Sport Lisboa adds Benfica to its name, becoming then Sport Lisboa e Benfica (SLB) and playing in Campo da Quinta da Feiteira.

Sport Lisboa e Benfica left after excessive rent, $400 for semester. They moved to Campo de Sete Rios.

Campo da Feiteira was converted into houses.

References

External links
Estádios do Benfica-Campo da Feiteira 

Campo da Feiteira
Campo da Feiteira
Sports venues completed in 1906
1906 establishments in Portugal